Mingo Fishtrap is a soul and funk band based in Austin, Texas. They were formed in the mid-1990s in Denton, Texas. The band consists of Roger Blevins, Jr. (guitar/lead vocals), Chip Vayenas (drums/vocals), Dane Farnsworth (organ/keyboards), Roger Blevins Sr. (bass), Steve Butts (trumpet/flugelhorn), and Dan Bechdolt (tenor saxophone). They have, with a few personnel changes over the years, released six albums and one concert video.

Reception 
Before a performance in Raleigh, North Carolina, in July 2016, Indy Week'''s Timothy Bracy wrote, "Long-running Austin soul and funk outfit Mingo Fishtrap features an agreeably accomplished horn-driven sound evocative of everything from Curtis Mayfield to early Chicago. Infectious tunes and plentiful chops figure to make for a crowd-pleasing evening."

 Discography 
 1997: Succotash 2000: From the Private Bag 2004: EP2 2005: Yesterday 2006: Live at the Granada 2008: EP3 2010: In the Meantime 2014: On Time''

References

External links
Official Website

American funk musical groups
American soul musical groups
Musical groups from Austin, Texas
Musical groups from Denton, Texas
Musical groups established in 1996